Fractured Life is the debut album by English alternative rock band Air Traffic. It was released on 2 July 2007 on the Tiny Consumer label, an imprint of EMI. The album contains UK Top 40 hit "Charlotte" as well as other singles "Just Abuse Me", "Never Even Told Me Her Name", "Shooting Star" and, most recently, "No More Running Away". The album was released in America on 5 February 2008.

In the first week of its release, Fractured Life attained a #42 on the UK Albums Chart. James Cannon, of Capital Radio, named the album "Album of the Week" for 2–9 July 2007. On 30 July 2007, the band re-released the album in a limited pressing 12 inch vinyl form.

The album was nominated for the 2008 XFM New Music Award, where the band played a special one-off performance at the ceremony at London's KOKO. The band was nominated for "Best International Newcomer" and "Best International Artist" at the 2007 and 2008 TMF Awards, respectively.

The track "Empty Space" was released as the iTunes free single of the week in the UK.

Chart performance

Track listing 
 "Just Abuse Me" - 2:33
 "Charlotte" - 2:24
 "Shooting Star" - 4:08
 "No More Running Away" - 4:23
 "Empty Space" - 3:37
 "Time Goes By" - 4:06
 "I Like That" - 2:26
 "Never Even Told Me Her Name" - 2:45
 "Get In Line" - 2:07
 "I Can't Understand" - 4:25
 "Your Fractured Life" - 22:55
Includes hidden track "Pee Wee Martini"

The Japanese release of Fractured Life includes bonus tracks "An End To All Our Problems" and "Left Out In The Rain", which are b-sides to former singles "Charlotte" and "Shooting Star" respectively. The US and German releases also included an extra track, "Come On." The track was released in the US and made available free to download from the band's website in the United Kingdom.

2007 debut albums
Air Traffic albums